Curry is a passenger train stop in Curry, Alaska, along the route of Alaska Railroad's Aurora Winter Train. Containing no platforms, the station is a stop for skiers skiing in the area.

References

External links

Alaska Railroad stations